Kiwuri (Aymara  canine tooth or tusk, -ri a suffix,  also spelled Kiburi, Quibure, Quiburi) may refer to:

 Kiwuri (Abaroa), a mountain in the Abaroa Province, Oruro Department, Bolivia
 Kiwuri (Potosí), a mountain in the Potosí Department, Bolivia
 Kiwuri (Totora), a mountain in the Totora Province, Oruro Department, Bolivia